The National Medical Products Administration (NMPA, formerly the China Food and Drug Administration, or CFDA) was founded on the basis of the former State Food and Drug Administration (SFDA). In March 2013, the former regulatory body was rebranded and restructured as the China Food and Drug Administration, elevating it to a ministerial-level agency. In 2018, as part of China's 2018 government administration overhaul, the name was changed to 'National Medical Products Administration' and merged into the newly created State Administration for Market Regulation. The headquarters are in Xicheng District, Beijing.

In its first incarnation as the CFDA, the NMPA replaced a large group of overlapping regulators with an entity similar to the Food and Drug Administration of the United States, streamlining regulation processes for food and drug safety.  The National Medical Products Administration is directly under the State Council of the People's Republic of China, which is in charge of comprehensive supervision on the safety management of food, health food and cosmetics and is the competent authority of drug regulation in mainland China.

On 10 July 2007, Zheng Xiaoyu, the former head of China's State Food And Drug Administration, was executed for taking bribes from various firms in exchange for state licences related to product safety.

Main responsibilities 

Draft laws, regulations and rules and policy plans on the administration and supervision of food (including food additives and health food, the same below) safety, drugs (including traditional Chinese medicines and ethno-medicines, the same below), medical devices and cosmetics; formulate normative documents, and facilitate the establishment and implementation of the food safety responsibility mechanism, under which food companies shall bear the main responsibility and local people's governments shall take integrated responsibility; establish the direct reporting system for critical food and drug information and supervise its implementation; take measures to reduce risks on regional and systemic food and drug safety;

Formulate the regulations on food administrative licensing and supervise their implementation; establish food safety risk management mechanism, formulate annual plans for nationwide inspection for food safety and programs for major control actions, and organize their implementation; establish the unified food safety information release system and release information on important food safety issues; participate in formulating food safety risk monitoring plans and food safety standards, and undertake food safety risk monitoring thereon;

Organize the formulation and publication of the national pharmacopeia, other drug and medical device standards and classification system, and supervise their implementation; develop good practices on research, production, distribution and use of drugs and medical devices, and supervise their implementation; undertake drug and medical device registration, supervision and inspection; establish monitoring system for adverse drug reactions, adverse events of medical devices, and undertake monitoring and response activities; draw up and improve regulations and qualifications for licensed pharmacists, guide and supervise the registration work; participate in formulating national essential medicine list and assist its implementation; formulate administrative provisions for cosmetics administration and supervise their implementation;

Formulate the investigation and enforcement system for food, drugs, medical devices and cosmetics, and organize their implementation; organize the investigation and punishment on major violations; establish recall and disposal system for defect products, and supervise the implementation;

Establish food and drug emergency response system, organize and guide the emergency response and investigation on food and drug safety incident, and supervise the implementation of investigation and punishment;

Formulate science and technology development plans for food and drug safety, and organize their implementation; accelerate the construction of food and drug testing system, electronic supervision tracking system, and information system;

Undertake the public communication, education and training, and international exchanges and cooperation in the field of food and drug safety; promote the establishment of credibility system;

Guide food and drug administration works of local governments, regulate administrative activities, and improve the interlocking mechanism between administrative enforcement and criminal justice;

Undertake the routine work of the Food Safety Commission of the State Council; take charge of comprehensive coordination on food safety administration, facilitate and improve the cooperation and coordination mechanism; supervise the work of provincial people's governments on food safety administration, and evaluate their performance;

Undertake other work assigned by the State Council and the Food Safety Commission of the State Council.

Registration for medical devices 
The NMPA is responsible for registration of medical devices for the Chinese market. All medical devices have to be classified by the CFDA according to its risk in three classes. Depending on the risk classification, different aspects are required: 
 For medical devices of class I: product tests are sometimes required
 For medical devices of class II: product tests are always required and clinical trials are sometimes required
 For medical devices of class III: product tests are always required

Organizational structure 
Internal structure of CFDA (forerunner of NMPA)
 General Office 
 Dept. of Legal Affairs
 Dept. of Food Safety Supervision (I - III)
 Dept. of Drug and Cosmetics Registration (Dept. of TCMs and Ethno-Medicines Supervision)
 Dept. of Medical Device Registration
 Dept. of Drug Cosmetics Supervision
 Dept. of Medical Device Supervision
 Bureau of Investigation and Enforcement
 Dept. of Emergency Management
 Dept. of Science, Technology and Standards
 Dept. of Media and Publicity
 Dept. of Human Resources
 Dept. of Planning and Finance
 Dept. of International Cooperation (Office of Hong Kong, Macao and Taiwan Affairs)

Management 
 Mr Bi Jingquan (Director)
 Mr Yin Li (deputy director) 
 Ms Wang Mingzhu (deputy director) 
 Mr Teng Jiacai (deputy director) 
 Mr Wu Zhen (deputy director) 
 Ms Jiao Hong (deputy director)
 Mr Li Wusi (Head of discipline inspection group)
 Mr Sun Xianze (assistant director for Drug Safety) 
 Mr Guo Wenqi (assistant director for Food Safety)

Standards and regulations 
The medical devices regulatory system is based on regulations issued by the State Council, NMPA orders and NMPA documents that provide detailed rules for medical device registration and licensing practice. Medical device type testing must be based upon the Chinese National Standard (Chinese: Guobiao, GB) or at least on an Industry Standard (YY). The system is undergoing frequent changes and adjustments. In October 2013, more than 104 new YY Standards were released.

Performance
Only 100 new drugs were approved between 2001 and 2016, about a third of the number in most Western countries.  Approval times have been cut from six to seven years down to two or three years and data from overseas clinical trials is now accepted.

See also 
 AQSIQ
 Pharmaceutical industry in China
 Food Administration
 Food safety in China
 International Conference on Harmonisation of Technical Requirements for Registration of Pharmaceuticals for Human Use (ICH)
 United States Food and Drug Administration

References

Further reading 
 Dali Yang, "Regulatory Learning and Its Discontents in China: Promise and Tragedy at the State Food and Drug Administration," in John Gillespie and Randall Peerenboom, eds., Pushing Back Globalization, Routledge, 2009.

External links 
   

Government agencies of China
Food safety organizations
National agencies for drug regulation
Medical and health organizations based in China
Drugs in China
Food safety in China
Regulation in China